Tana Toraja ( 'Toraja Land' in Toraja language) is a landlocked regency (kabupaten) of South Sulawesi Province of Indonesia, and home to the Toraja ethnic group. The local government seat is in the town of Makale, while the traditional center of Toraja culture is in Rantepao. Formerly, the Tana Toraja area covered a larger area, but in 2008 this was divided into two regencies, consisting of Tana Toraja with its capital at Makale and Toraja Utara (North Toraja) with its capital at Rantepao.

The Tana Toraja boundary was determined by the Dutch East Indies government in 1909. In 1926, Tana Toraja was under the administration of the Bugis state, Luwu. The regentschap (or regency) status was given on 8 October 1946, the last regency given by the Dutch. Since 1984, Tana Toraja has been named as the second tourist destination after Bali by the Ministry of Tourism, Indonesia. Since then, hundreds of thousands of foreign visitors have visited this regency. In addition, numerous Western anthropologists have come to Tana Toraja to study the indigenous culture and people of Toraja.

[[Image:COLLECTIE TROPENMUSEUM 'Leden van de 'Toradjasche Christelijke Jongelieden Vereeniging 'Boenga Lalan voor de pastorie te Malaboh Toraja Sulawesi.' TMnr 10001356.jpg|thumb|right|375px|Christian mission in Tana Toraja Regency, Netherlands colonial period.picture credits : Tropenmuseum.]]

 History 
The government in Toraja has been started since the government Dutch East Indies. Based on the Emergency Law No. 3 of 1957, the District Level II Tana Toraja was formed which was inaugurated on 31 August 1957 with the first Regent of the Regional Head named Lakitta.

Decree of the Governor of the First Level Region of South Sulawesi Number 954/XI/1998 dated 14 December 1998, the district of Tana Toraja consisted of 9 definitive districts, 6 district representatives, 22 districts, and 63 villages. Then Law No. 22/1999 on Regional Government was issued, and followed up by issuing Regional Regulation No. 18 of 2000 dated 29 December 2000, 6 district representatives were changed to definitive districts, bringing the total number of districts to 15 definitive districts, 22 districts and 63 villages.

In 2001, the regional regulation no. 2 of 2001 dated 11 April 2001 provided for the entire description of the existing "village" to changed their names to "lembang". After the stipulation of Regional Regulation No. 2 of 2001 concerning the First Amendment to Regional Regulation No. 18 of 2000, the Regional Regulation of Tana-Toraja Regency Number 8 of 2004 concerning the second amendment to the Regional Regulation Number 18 of 2000, as well as the regional regulation number 6 of 2005 concerning the amendment of the Third Regional Regulation Number 18 of 2000, the Tana Toraja Regency area developed into 40 administrative districts (kecamatan), subdivided into 87 urban kelurahan and 223 lembang (rural villages).

Next came the discourse of regional expansion, namely North Toraja Regency. The discourse of the expansion has created pros and cons among the Toraja people themselves. The formation of North Toraja Regency was finally determined through the plenary session of the People's Representative Council on 24 June 2008. However, the inauguration of North Toraja Regency was carried out two months later, which was coupled with the commemoration of the 51st anniversary of Tana Toraja Regency, namely on 31 August 2008.

 Geography 
Tana Toraja is centrally placed in the island of Sulawesi, 300 km north of Makassar, the provincial capital of South Sulawesi. It lies between latitude of 2°-3° South and longitude 119°-120° East. The total area (since the separation of the new regency of North Toraja) is 2,054.30 km2, about 4.4% of the total area of South Sulawesi province. The topography of Tana Toraja is mountainous; its minimum elevation is 150 m, while the maximum is 3,083 above the sea level.

 Administrative Districts 
Tana Toraja Regency comprises nineteen administrative Districts (Kecamatan), tabulated below with their areas and their populations at the 2010 census and the 2020 census, together with the official estimates as at mid 2021. The table also includes the locations of the administrative centres of the districts, the numbers of administrative villages (kelurahan and desa'') within each district, and its post code.

Demographics

Ethnicity 

The original tribe that inhabits Tana Toraja is the Toraja tribe. The Toraja people are a tribe who live in the mountainous region of the northern part of the province of South Sulawesi, Indonesia. The population of the Toraja people is estimated at around 1 million people, and 500,000 of them are in Tana Toraja Regency, North Toraja Regency, and Mamasa Regency. Most of the Toraja people embrace Christianity, while some adhere to Islam and an animist belief known as Aluk Todolo. The Indonesian government has recognized this belief as part of the Hindu religion.

The word Toraja itself comes from the Bugis language, namely "to riaja" which means "people who live in the land above". In 1909, the Dutch colonial government called this tribe the Toraja. The Toraja tribe is famous for its funeral rituals, Tongkonan traditional houses and also various types of wood carvings typical of Toraja. Toraja funeral rituals are important social events, usually attended by hundreds of people and lasting for several days.

Before the 20th century, the Toraja tribe still lived in autonomous villages. They previously still adhered to animism, and had not been touched by the outside world. In the early 1900s, Dutch missionaries arrived and began to spread Christianity. Then, around the 1970s, Toraja people began to open up to the outside world, and Tana Toraja district (before it was expanded) became a symbol of Indonesian tourism. Then there was the development of Tana Toraja tourism, and it was studied by anthropology. So that in 1990-1s, the Toraja people underwent a cultural transformation, from a society with traditional and agrarian beliefs, to a society that was predominantly Christian, and the tourism sector in the Tana Toraja area continued to increase.

Religion 

Based on data from the Ministry of Home Affairs in 2021, it is noted that the majority of Tana Toraja's population adheres to Christianity, namely 85.94%, of which Protestantism is 69.49% and Roman Catholic is 16.45%. Most of the others are Islam, namely 12.17%, then Hinduism 1.71%, Buddhism 0.17% and others 0.01%.

Tourism

Tourist attractions 

Tana Toraja is one of the tourist destinations or tourist destinations with a cultural background in Indonesia, especially in the province of South Sulawesi. The life of the indigenous people, namely the Toraja people, as well as a unique culture, makes this highland area in South Sulawesi chosen by tourists to see and learn Toraja culture.

In 1974, Tongkonan Siguntu' dirara (traditional ceremony / Rambu Tuka') was attended by delegates from 60 foreign countries who attended the PATA conference in Jakarta in 1974. Since then Toraja has become known as a cultural tourism destination in Indonesia.

Buntu Kalando 
Tongkonan/house where Puang Sangalla' (king of Sangalla') lives. As the resting place of Puang Sangala' and also the palace where the government of the Sangalla' kingdom was managed at that time, Tongkonan Buntu Kalando had the title "tando tananan langi' lantangna Kaero tongkonan layuk". Currently Tongkonan Buntu Kalando is used as a museum to store prehistoric objects and relics of the Sangalla kingdom.

Kambira 
The graves of babies whose teeth have not yet grown (aged 6 months and under) are placed in a living tree that is hollowed out.

Pallawa 
Tongkonan Pallawa is one of the tongkonan or traditional house that is very interesting and is located among the bamboo trees at the top of the hill. The tongkonan is decorated with a number of buffalo horns that are plugged in the front of the traditional house. Located about 12 km to the north of Rantepao.

Lemo 
The place is often referred to as the home of the spirits. At the Lemo cemetery, we can see corpses kept in the open air, in the middle of steep rocks. This burial complex is a blend of death, art and ritual. At certain times the clothes of the corpses will be changed through the Ma' Nene ceremony.

Located on Burake Hill, Tana Toraja has built the Statue of Jesus Christ Blessing which is claimed to be the tallest Jesus statue in the world. This means that the location of the statue is at an altitude of 1100 meters above sea level or the location of the tallest statue in the world, while the size of the statue itself is not the highest in the world.

Conservation efforts 
Tana Toraja is one of the conservation sites for the PROTO MELAYU AUSTRONESIAN cultural civilization which is still well-maintained today. Traditional culture, music, dance, oral literary arts, language, houses, carvings, weaving and culinary which are still very traditional, have made the Indonesian government strive for Tana Toraja to be known internationally, one of which is to nominate Tana Toraja to UNESCO for became a UNESCO World Heritage Site since 2009.

This is supported by Japan to make Tana Toraja a UNESCO World Heritage Site, Japan itself will participate in the conservation efforts, especially related to traditional houses in the area.

This support was conveyed in a meeting between the Indonesian and Japanese delegations in Poznan, Poland, Saturday 11 November 2010. September 10 in Poznan attended by representatives from about 40 countries in Asia and Europe.

See also 

 List of regencies and cities of Indonesia

References

External links 
Toraja Treasures.com - Toraja online information.
 
 
 Rural Tana Toraja Region: Photo Essay

 
Regencies of South Sulawesi